The 2012–13 Northern Illinois Huskies men's basketball team represented Northern Illinois University during the 2013–14 NCAA Division I men's basketball season. The Huskies, led by third year head coach Mark Montgomery, played their home games at the Convocation Center as members of the West Division of the Mid-American Conference. They finished the season 15–17, 8–10 in MAC play to finish in fourth place in the West Division. They advanced to the second round of the MAC tournament where they lost to Eastern Michigan.

Season

Preseason
The Huskies announced their complete season schedule on September 3, 2013. Highlighted by an early November tournament at home featuring San Jose State, James Madison, and Milwaukee, the Huskies schedule included 16 home games. The Huskies also scheduled to make trips to Nebraska, UMass, and Iowa State. For the conference schedule, the Huskies schedule home-and-home series with Ball State, Central Michigan, Eastern Michigan, Toledo, Western Michigan, Buffalo, and Kent State, while hosting Ohio and Miami and visiting Akron and Bowling Green.

Roster

Departures

Recruits

NIU also got Aaron Armstead, transfer from San Jose City College. Redshirted last year, Pete Rakocevic is also eligible this year.

Schedule and results
Source: 

|-
!colspan=9 style="background:#000000; color:#C41E3A;"| Exhibition

|-
!colspan=9 style="background:#000000; color:#C41E3A;"| Non-conference games

|-
!colspan=9 style="background:#000000; color:#C41E3A;"| Conference games

|-
!colspan=9 style="background:#000000; color:#C41E3A;"| MAC tournament

References

Northern Illinois
Northern Illinois Huskies men's basketball seasons
Northern
Northern